Gaffar is a male Muslim given name of Arabic origin and may refer to:

 Bumin Gaffar Çitanak (born 1934), Turkish film actor known as Fikret Hakan
 Gaffar Ahmed, Fijian politician of Indian descent
 Gaffar Okkan (1952-2001), assassinated Turkish police chief

See also
Abdul Ghaffar

Arabic masculine given names